This list of United States Army Field Manuals contains information about a variety of United States Army Field Manuals.

Abbreviations and Keys
 ADP # means Army Doctrine Publication No. #;
 FM # means Field Manual No. #;
 DA means Department of the Army;
 GPO means Government Publishing Office;
 HQ, DA means Headquarters, Department of the Army;
 WD means War Department.

Two capstones
ADP 1 and ADP 3–0 are the two capstones of U.S. Army's field manuals.

ADP 1 (FM 1, FM 100–1)

ADP 3–0 (FM 3–0, FM 100–5, Field Service Regulations)

 i. FSR is equals to Field Service Regulations.
 ii. Detached edition is not known.

See also
 United States Army Field Manuals

References

External links
 Active FM — Army Doctrine and Training Publications
 ADP — Army Doctrine and Training Publications